Marek Waldemar Pasionek (7 January 1961 − 31 March 2022) was a Polish lawyer and government official. He served as Deputy Public Prosecutor General from 2016 to 2022. Pasionek died on 31 March 2022, at the age of 61.

References

1961 births
2022 deaths
20th-century Polish lawyers
University of Silesia in Katowice alumni
People from Gliwice
21st-century Polish lawyers